Dolsing Fourmen (lit. Shoes Off Return To Single Four Men) is a South Korean television program that currently airs on SBS weekly on Tuesday nights. The first episode was aired on July 13, 2021 at 22:00 (KST).

Format 
A spin-off of the popular SBS reality show My Little Old Boy, it is a talk and variety show starring four male celebrities averaging 50.5 years old in age, had divorced, and are more thirsty for happiness than anyone else. In each episode, the cast invites guests to one of the cast's house, and have conversations and share stories about career, love, marriage, etc.

Cast
 Tak Jae-hoon
 Im Won-hee
 Lee Sang-min
 Kim Jun-ho

Episodes (2021)

Episodes (2022)

Episodes (2023)

Ratings
 The table below show the highest rating received in red, and the lowest rating in blue each year.

2021

2022

2023

Notes

References

External links

South Korean reality television series
2021 South Korean television series debuts
2021 South Korean television series endings
Seoul Broadcasting System original programming
Korean-language television shows
South Korean variety television shows